Kinzyabulatovo (Kinyäbulat) is a rural locality (a village) in Surensky Selsoviet, Zianchurinsky District, Bashkortostan, Russia. The population was 183 as of 2010. There are 2 streets.

Geography 
Kinzyabulatovo is located 19 km southeast of Isyangulovo (the district's administrative centre) by road. Kugarchi is the nearest rural locality.

References 

Rural localities in Zianchurinsky District